Sachna Bazar High School is a secondary school located on the north side of market Sachna Bazar in Sunamganj District. The EIIN number of this school is '129986' and situated at Jamalganj, Sunamganj, Sylhet Division, Bangladesh. The geographical coordinates are 24°59'49.29" North, 91°14'1.55" East.

History 
Sachna Bazar High School is established as junior secondary school on 22 January 1989. On 1 January 1991, this is granted from Board of Intermediate and Secondary Education, Cumilla. This school is listed at MPO as Junior Secondary School on 1 July 1993. Approved as secondary school on 1 January 1996. Science department has been started from 1995 and Business Studies department started very recently. On 1 April 1999 listed in MPO as a secondary school.

Campus 
The Sachna Bazar High School campus has an area of 1.7 acres, consisting of four buildings - two of them inter-connected, a 0.61 acres sports ground. The first, second and third buildings are three stories high. The first two floors, excluding the ground floor of both inter-connected buildings are used for academic purposes. The Central Hall, teacher's lounge, administrative offices are on the ground floor. The library, headmasters office located on the ground floor. Physics, chemistry, biology and computer lab is situated in 2nd floor.

Departments 
 Science
 Humanities 
 Business Studies

Achievements 
In 2004, placed 7th position in whole Education Board, Sylhet.

Uniform 
All students wear school uniform.

Boys:  white shirt and skyblue pant.

Girls:  skyblue frock, white pajama and white scarf.

Class time 
Everyday class held from 10:00 AM to 5:00 PM with 1 hour break for lunch and prayer.

References

Sunamganj District
Schools in Bangladesh